The John Nolen Plan of Venice Historic District is a U.S. historic district located on the west coast of Venice, Florida. The district, planned by John Nolen in 1926 for the Brotherhood of Locomotive Engineers, is bounded by Laguna Drive on north, Home Park Road on east, the Corso on south, and The Esplanade on west. The district encompasses many other properties and historic districts already listed on the National Register of Historic Places including:

 Armada Road Multi-Family District
 Blalock House
 Hotel Venice
 Johnson-Schoolcrafy Building
 Levillain-Letton House
 Triangle Inn
 Valencia Hotel and Arcade
 Venice Depot
 Venezia Park Historic District
 Edgewood Historic District

It was added to the National Register of Historic Places on September 23, 2009.

Gallery

References

National Register of Historic Places in Sarasota County, Florida
Historic districts on the National Register of Historic Places in Florida
Brotherhood of Locomotive Engineers and Trainmen